Mary Brian (born Louise Byrdie Dantzler, February 17, 1906  –  December 30, 2002) was an American actress who made the transition from silent films to sound films.

Early life
Brian was born in Corsicana, Texas, the daughter of Taurrence J. Dantzler and Louise B. Her brother was Taurrence J. Dantzler, Jr.

Her father died when she was one month old and the family later moved to Dallas, Texas. In the early 1920s, they moved to Long Beach, California. She had intended becoming an illustrator but that was laid aside when at age 16 she was discovered in a local bathing beauty contest. One of the judges was actress Esther Ralston (who was to play her mother in the upcoming Peter Pan and who became a lifelong friend).

She didn't win the $25 prize in the contest, but Ralston said "you've got to give the little girl something." So, her prize was to be interviewed by director Herbert Brenon for a role in Peter Pan. Brenon was recovering from eye surgery, and she spoke with him in a dimly lit room. "He asked me a few questions, Is that your hair? Out of the blue, he said I would like to make a test. Even to this day, I will never know why I was that lucky. They had made tests of every ingénue in the business for Wendy. He had decided he would go with an unknown. It would seem more like a fairy tale. It wouldn't seem right if the roles were to be taken by someone they (the audience) knew or was divorced. I got the part. They put me under contract." The studio renamed her Mary Brian.

Discovery

After her showing in the beauty contest, she was given an audition by Paramount Pictures and cast by director Herbert Brenon as Wendy Darling in his silent movie version of J.M. Barrie's Peter Pan (1924). There she starred with Betty Bronson and Esther Ralston, and the three of them stayed close for the rest of their lives. Ralston described both Bronson and Brian as 'very charming people'.

The movie studio, who created her stage name for the movie and said she was age 16 instead of 18 because the latter sounded too old for the role, then signed her to a long-term contract. Brian played Fancy Vanhern, daughter of Percy Marmont, in Brenon's The Street of Forgotten Men (1925), which had newcomer Louise Brooks in an uncredited role as a moll.

Career rise
Brian was dubbed "The Sweetest Girl in Pictures." On loan-out to MGM, she played a college belle, Mary Abbott, opposite William Haines and Jack Pickford in Brown of Harvard (1926). She was named one of the WAMPAS Baby Stars in 1926, along with Mary Astor, Dolores Costello, Joan Crawford, Dolores del Río, Janet Gaynor, and Fay Wray.

During her years at Paramount, Brian appeared in more than 40 movies as the lead, the ingenue or co-star. She worked with Brenon again in 1926 when she played Isabel in P.C. Wren's Beau Geste starring Ronald Colman. The same year, she made Behind the Front and Harold Teen. In 1928, she played ingenue Alice Deane in Forgotten Faces opposite Clive Brook, her sacrificing father, with Olga Baclanova as her vixen mother and William Powell as Froggy. Forgotten Faces is preserved in the Library of Congress.

Successful transition to sound films

Her first sound film was Varsity (1928), which was filmed with part-sound and talking sequences, opposite Buddy Rogers. After successfully making the transition to sound, she co-starred with Gary Cooper, Walter Huston and Richard Arlen in The Virginian (1929), her first all-sound movie. In it, she played a spirited frontier heroine, schoolmarm Molly Stark Wood, who was the love interest of the Virginian (Cooper).

Brian co-starred in several hits during the 1930s, including her role as Gwen Cavendish in George Cukor’s comedy The Royal Family of Broadway (1930) with Ina Claire and Fredric March, as herself in Paramount's all-star revue Paramount on Parade (1930), as Peggy Grant in Lewis Milestone’s comedy The Front Page (1931) with Adolphe Menjou and Pat O'Brien.

After her contract with Paramount ended in 1932, Brian decided to freelance, which was unusual in a period when multi-year contracts with one studio were common. The same year, she appeared on the vaudeville stage at New York City's Palace Theatre. Also in the same year, she starred in Manhattan Tower.

Other movie roles include Murial Ross, aka Murial Rossi, in Shadows of Sing Sing (1933), in which she received top billing; Gloria Van Dayham in College Rhythm (1934); Yvette Lamartine in Charlie Chan in Paris (1935); Hope Wolfinger, W.C. Fields’s daughter, in Man on the Flying Trapeze (1935); Sally Barnaby in Spendthrift (1936); and Doris in Navy Blues (1937), in which she received top billing.

In 1936, she went to England and made three movies, including The Amazing Quest of Ernest Bliss, in which she starred opposite Cary Grant, with whom she became engaged at one stage.

Her final film of the 1930s was Affairs of Cappy Ricks, but she auditioned unsuccessfully for the part that went to Janet Gaynor in A Star is Born.

Later career
When World War II occurred in 1941, Brian began traveling to entertain the troops, spending most of the war years traveling the world with the U.S.O., and entertaining servicemen from the South Pacific to Europe, including Italy and North Africa. Commenting on those events, she said in 1996,
I was with Charlie Ruggles in Okinawa. And I was on the island of Tinian when they dropped the atomic bomb. Colonel Paul Tibbets, who was the pilot and the officer in charge [of dropping the bomb] took Charlie and me on the plane the next day, and nobody had been allowed in that encampment. So I was on the Enola Gay.
Flying to England on a troop shoot, Mary got caught in the Battle of the Bulge and spent the Christmas of 1944 with the soldiers fighting that battle.

She appeared in only a handful of films thereafter. Her last performance in movies was in Dragnet (1947). Over the course of 22 years, Brian had appeared in more than 79 movies.

She played in the stage comedy Mary Had a Little... in 1951 in Melbourne, Australia, co-starring with John Hubbard.

Like many "older" actresses, during the 1950s Brian created a career in television. Perhaps her most notable role was playing the title character's mother in  Meet Corliss Archer in 1954.

She also dedicated much time to portrait painting after her acting years.

Personal life and death

Although she was engaged numerous times and was linked romantically to numerous Hollywood men, including Cary Grant and silent film actor Jack Pickford, Brian had only two husbands: magazine illustrator Jon Whitcomb (for six weeks, beginning May 4, 1941) and film editor George Tomasini (from 1947 until his death in 1964). After retiring from movies for good, she devoted herself to her husband's career; Tomasini worked as film editor for Hitchcock on Rear Window (1954) and Psycho (1960).

She died of natural causes on December 30, 2002, at a retirement home in Del Mar, California at the age of 96.

Legacy
In 1960, Brian was inducted into the Hollywood Walk of Fame with a motion pictures star at 1559 Vine Street.

Selected filmography
 Peter Pan (1924) as Wendy Moira Angela Darling
 The Little French Girl (1925) as Alix Vervier
 The Air Mail (1925) as Minnie Wade
 The Street of Forgotten Men (1925) as Mary Vanhern
 A Regular Fellow (1925) as Girl
 The Enchanted Hill (1926) as Hallie Purdy
 Behind the Front (1926) as Betty Bartlett-Cooper
 Paris at Midnight (1926) as Victorine Tallefer
 Brown of Harvard (1926) as Mary Abbott
 More Pay - Less Work (1926) as Betty Ricks
 Beau Geste (1926) as Isabel Rivers
 Prince of Tempters (1926) as Mary
 Battling Butler (1926)
 Stepping Along (1926) as Molly Taylor
 Her Father Said No (1927) as Charlotte Hamilton
 High Hat (1927) as Millie
 Knockout Reilly (1927) as Mary Malone
 Running Wild (1927) as Elizabeth Finch
 Man Power (1927) as Alice Stoddard
 Shanghai Bound (1927) as Sheila
 Two Flaming Youths (1927) as Mary Gilfoil
 Under the Tonto Rim (1928) as Lucy Watson
 Partners in Crime (1928) as Marie Burke, The Cigarette Girl
 Harold Teen (1928) as Lillums Lovewell
 The Big Killing (1928) as Mary Beagle - Old Man Beagle's Daughter
 Forgotten Faces (1928) as Alice Deane
 Varsity (1928) as Fay
 Someone to Love (1928) as Joan Kendricks
 Black Waters (1929) as Eunice
 The Man I Love (1929) as Celia Fields
 River of Romance (1929) as Lucy Jeffers
 The Virginian (1929) as Molly Stark Wood
 The Marriage Playground (1929) as Judith Wheater
 The Kibitzer (1930) as Josie Lazarus
 Burning Up (1930) as Ruth Morgan
 The Canary Murder Case (1929)
 Only the Brave (1930) as Barbara Calhoun
 The Light of Western Stars (1930) as Ruth Hammond
 Galas de la Paramount (1930) as Sweetheart - Episode 'Dream Girl'
 The Social Lion (1930) as Cynthia Brown
 Only Saps Work (1930) as Barbara Tanner
 The Royal Family of Broadway (1930) as Gwen Cavendish
 Captain Applejack (1931) as Poppy Faire
 The Front Page (1931) as Peggy Grant
 Gun Smoke (1931) as Sue Vancey
 The Homicide Squad (1931) as Millie
 The Runaround (1931) as Evelyn
 Hollywood Halfbacks (1931, Short)
 It's Tough to Be Famous (1932) as Janet Porter McClenahan
 Blessed Event (1932) as Gladys Price
 The Unwritten Law (1932) as Ruth Evans
 Manhattan Tower (1932) as Mary Harper
 Hard to Handle (1933) as Ruth Waters
 Girl Missing (1933) as June Dale
 The World Gone Mad (1933) as Diane Cromwell
 Song of the Eagle (1933) as Elsa Kranzmeyer
 Moonlight and Pretzels (1933) as Sally Upton
 One Year Later (1933) as Molly Collins
 Fog (1933) as Mary Fulton
 Shadows of Sing Sing (1933) as Muriel Ross aka Muriel Rossi
 Ever Since Eve (1934) as Elizabeth Vandergrift
 Private Scandal (1934) as Fran Somers
 Monte Carlo Nights (1934) as Mary Vernon
 College Rhythm (1934) as Gloria Van Dayham
 Charlie Chan in Paris (1935) as Yvette Lamartine
 Man on the Flying Trapeze (1935) as Hope Wolfinger
 Once in a Million (1936) as Suzanne
 Two's Company (1936) as Julia Madison
 Spendthrift (1936) as Sally Barnaby
 The Amazing Quest of Ernest Bliss (1936) as Frances Clayton
 Three Married Men (1936) as Jennie Mullins
 Killer at Large (1936) as Linda Allen
 Navy Blues (1937) as Doris Kimbell
 Affairs of Cappy Ricks (1937) as Frances 'Frankie' Ricks
 Calaboose (1943) as Doris Lane
 I Escaped from the Gestapo (1943) as Helen
 Danger! Women at Work (1943) as Pert
 The Captain from Köpenick (1945) as Frau Obermueller, the Mayor's Wife
 Dragnet (1947) as Anne Hogan

References

External links

AFI Catalog Silent Films entry for Mary Brian
Mary Brian, Silent and Sound Movie Star
Silent Era: People: Actresses: Mary Brian
Photographs of Mary Brian

1906 births
2002 deaths
American stage actresses
American film actresses
American silent film actresses
American television actresses
People from Dallas
Actresses from Long Beach, California
Actresses from Texas
People from Corsicana, Texas
20th-century American actresses
Paramount Pictures contract players